Table tennis at the 1992 Summer Paralympics consisted of 30 events, 21 for men and 9 for women.

Swimming, athletics and table tennis used a medical based classification system for the Barcelona Games.  This happened as the Games were in a transition period with a number of other sports starting to move to a fully functional based classification system.

Medal table

Medal summary

Men's events

Women's events

References 

 

1992 Summer Paralympics events
1992
1992 in table tennis